Piet Ouderland (17 March 1933 – 3 September 2017) was a Dutch footballer and basketball player. As a footballer, he played as a striker for Ajax, AZ Alkmaar and the Netherlands national team. For Ajax, he made 261 total appearances with the club between 1955 and 1964, becoming a member of Club van 100. He also made seven appearances with the national team in 1962 and 1963. As a basketball player, he also played for the national team, making him the first Dutchman to play for the national sides of football and basketball.

References

External links 
 

1933 births
2017 deaths
AFC Ajax players
Association football forwards
Dutch footballers
Dutch men's basketball players
Eredivisie players
Footballers from Amsterdam
Netherlands international footballers
Basketball players from Amsterdam